UFC 255: Figueiredo vs. Perez was a mixed martial arts event produced by the Ultimate Fighting Championship that took place on November 21, 2020 at the UFC Apex facility in Enterprise, Nevada, part of the Las Vegas Metropolitan Area, United States.

Background 
A UFC Flyweight Championship bout between current champion Deiveson Figueiredo and former UFC Bantamweight Champion Cody Garbrandt was expected to serve as the event headliner. However, it was announced on October 2 that Garbrandt pulled out due to a torn bicep and was replaced by Alex Perez, who was already scheduled to face Brandon Moreno at the event. Moreno faced Brandon Royval instead.

A UFC Women's Flyweight Championship bout between current champion Valentina Shevchenko and Jennifer Maia co-headlined the event.

John Allan and Roman Dolidze were originally scheduled to meet at this event in a light heavyweight bout. They were eventually rescheduled for UFC on ESPN: Hermansson vs. Vettori in December.

Former UFC Welterweight Champion Robbie Lawler was expected to face Mike Perry at this event. However, Lawler pulled out of the fight in late October citing an undisclosed injury. He was replaced by Tim Means.

A welterweight bout between Orion Cosce and Nicolas Dalby was expected to take place at this event. However, Cosce pulled out on November 12 due to undisclosed reasons and was replaced by Daniel Rodriguez.

At the weigh-ins, Perry weighed in at 175.5 pounds, four and a half pounds over the welterweight non-title fight limit. His bout proceeded at a catchweight and he was fined 30% of his individual purse, which went to his opponent Tim Means.

Results

Bonus awards
The following fighters received $50,000 bonuses.
Fight of the Night: Sasha Palatnikov vs. Louis Cosce
Performance of the Night: Joaquin Buckley and Antonina Shevchenko

See also 

 List of UFC events
 List of current UFC fighters
 2020 in UFC

References 

Ultimate Fighting Championship events
2020 in mixed martial arts
2020 in sports in Nevada
Mixed martial arts in Las Vegas
Sports competitions in Las Vegas
November 2020 sports events in the United States